Daniel Lewis Karbler is a United States Army lieutenant general currently serving as the commander of the United States Army Space and Missile Defense Command. Prior to that, he was the chief of staff of the United States Strategic Command.

Karbler received a B.S. degree from the United States Military Academy in 1987. He later earned a Master of Business Arts degree from Benedictine College and an M.A. degree in strategic studies from the Naval War College. Karbler also studied at the Army Command and General Staff College and the National War College.

References

 
 

 
 

Year of birth missing (living people)
Living people
United States Military Academy alumni
Benedictine College alumni
United States Army Command and General Staff College alumni
Naval War College alumni
National War College alumni
Recipients of the Legion of Merit
United States Army generals
Recipients of the Defense Superior Service Medal
Recipients of the Distinguished Service Medal (US Army)